S. Muthusamy (ta: சு. முத்துசாமி) is an Indian Tamil politician and Member of the Legislative Assembly and minister of Tamil Nadu. He was elected to the Tamil Nadu legislative assembly as an Anna Dravida Munnetra Kazhagam candidate from Erode constituency in 1977, 1980 and 1984 elections and from Bhavani constituency in 1991 election. He served as Transport Minister in MGR cabinet and as health minister in Jayalalitha cabinet formed after 1991 election. 
 
Muthusamy joined the DMK in 2010 and he was elected to the Tamil Nadu legislative assembly as a Dravida Munnetra Kazhagam candidate from Erode West Constituency in 2021.

Activities 
S. Muthusamy is an active local politician involved in the development of areas around Erode.
Apart from implementing lot of basic infrastructure schemes for Erode and developing the Transport department up to a remarkable extent in Kongu region, Muthusamy was instrumental in bringing notable schemes like the new Erode Collector's office, Erode Bus Stand, IRTT (College of Technology), IRTT Medical college, New Bridge on Bhavani-Erode road etc. Muthusamy joined the DMK in 2010 and he is a member of the DMK High Command Executive committee and now he is a district secretary.

Elections contested and results

References 

Tamil Nadu ministers
Living people
Year of birth missing (living people)
Tamil Nadu MLAs 1991–1996
Tamil Nadu MLAs 2021–2026
Tamil Nadu MLAs 1985–1989
Dravida Munnetra Kazhagam politicians